Bernard Longpré (January 1, 1937 – June 24, 2002) was a Canadian director and animator.

Longpré was born in 1937 in Montreal, Quebec.

Filmography 

 An Introduction to Jet Engines (1959)
 Bandwidth (1960)
 Four-line Conics (1961)
 Fundamentals of Fish Spoilage (1962)
 An Introduction to NUTMEG (1963)
 IFF Mark 10: Selective Identification Feature (1963)
 The Ball Resolver in Antac (1964)
 Country Auction (1964)
 Test 0558 (1965)
 Glaciation (1965)
 Dimensions (1966)
 En février (1966)
 L'Évasion des carrousels (1968)
 Tête en fleurs (1969)
 Dimension soleils (1970)
 Nébule (1973)
 Branch et Branch (1974)
 Contes de la mère loi sur cinéma (1975)
 Monsieur Pointu (1975)
 L'Invasion (1775-1975) (1976)
 Les Naufragés du quartier/One Way Street (1980)
 La Solution (1985)
 Itinerary/Itinéraire (1987)
 Felicity/Félicité (1989)

References

External links 
 

Canadian animated film directors
1937 births
2002 deaths
National Film Board of Canada people